S800 may refer to :
 Canon S800, a Canon S Series digital camera
 Honda S800, a 1965 sport car
 Snapdragon 800, a quad-core mobile processor by Qualcomm

S-800 may refer to :
 NATO codename for 1975 Russian Zaslon radar